Nikola Andrew Lalich (May 8, 1916 – May 11, 2001) was a Serbian American professional basketball player. He played for the Youngstown Bears in the National Basketball League (NBL) during the 1945–46 season. He was a star college basketball player at Ohio University in the 1930s, where he earned a bachelor's degree in industrial arts. Later, Lalich earned a master's degree from Columbia University in New York. His younger brother, Pete Lalich, played four seasons in the NBL and one game in the BAA.

Nick Lalich also served with the Office of Strategic Services (OSS; predecessor of CIA) during World War II, helping to rescue and evacuate approximately 550 downed Allied fliers during Operation Halyard, without losing a single life or plane. He later worked for the CIA in Greece from 1952 to 1957.

References

1916 births
2001 deaths
Amateur Athletic Union men's basketball players
American men's basketball players
United States Army personnel of World War II
American people of Serbian descent
Basketball players from Cleveland
Columbia University alumni
Guards (basketball)
Ohio Bobcats men's basketball players
Sportspeople from Lorain, Ohio
Youngstown Bears players
People of the Office of Strategic Services
United States Army officers